Sphaerirostris is a genus of parasitic worms belonging to the family Centrorhynchidae.

The species of this genus are found in Europe, Russia and Northern America.

Species:

Sphaerirostris areolatus 
Sphaerirostris batrachus 
Sphaerirostris bipartitus

References

Polymorphida
Acanthocephala families